Kortajarena is a Basque surname. People with this surname include:

 Jon Kortajarena (born 1985), Spanish male model
 José Ángel Iribar, Spanish footballer (maternal surname)
 Lazkao Txiki (Joxe Miguel Iztueta Cortajarena}, Spanish musician

Basque-language surnames